Henri Deglane (22 June 1902 – 7 July 1975) was a French wrestler. He was an Olympic Champion in Greco-Roman wrestling and AWA World Champion.

In May 1931, Deglane faced Ed "Strangler" Lewis for the AWA World Heavyweight Championship in Montreal in a two-out-of-three falls match. After two falls, Deglane had feigned being bitten by Lewis, when in reality he had been bitten in the locker room. This led to Deglane being awarded the title via disqualification and a dispute over who was actually acknowledged as champion over the next two years.

In July 1937 in Paris, France, Deglane lost his European Heavyweight Championship title to American Al Pereira.

He was inducted into the Wrestling Observer Hall of Fame in 2013 for his accomplishments in professional wrestling.

Olympics
Deglane competed at the 1924 Summer Olympics in Paris and won a gold medal in Greco-Roman wrestling, the heavyweight class.

Championships and accomplishments
American Wrestling Association (Boston)
AWA World Heavyweight Championship (1 time)
Wrestling Observer Newsletter
Wrestling Observer Newsletter Hall of Fame (Class of 2013)

References

External links

1902 births
1975 deaths
Sportspeople from Limoges
Olympic wrestlers of France
Wrestlers at the 1924 Summer Olympics
French male sport wrestlers
Olympic gold medalists for France
Olympic medalists in wrestling
Medalists at the 1924 Summer Olympics
French male professional wrestlers